Alex Campbell (born April 20, 1948) is a Canadian former ice hockey player. He played professionally in the International Hockey League with the Muskegon Mohawks during the 1971-72 season.

Campbell was selected by the Boston Bruins in the 1st round (2nd overall) of the 1964 NHL Amateur Draft, but never played a game in the National Hockey League.

References

External links

1948 births
Living people
Canadian ice hockey right wingers
Boston Bruins draft picks
National Hockey League first-round draft picks
Peterborough Petes (ice hockey) players
St. Lawrence Saints men's ice hockey players
Ice hockey people from Ontario
Sportspeople from Chatham-Kent